William Shepherd House is a historic home located at Bath in Steuben County, New York.  It was built in 1873 and is a two-story Italian Villa style brick dwelling on a raised ashlar basement.

It was listed on the National Register of Historic Places in 1983.

References

Houses on the National Register of Historic Places in New York (state)
Italianate architecture in New York (state)
Houses completed in 1873
Houses in Steuben County, New York
National Register of Historic Places in Steuben County, New York